Imigongo is an art form popular in Rwanda traditionally made by women using cow dung. Often in the colors black, white and red, popular themes include spiral and geometric designs that are painted on walls, pottery, and canvas.

The images are produced using cow dung which is put onto wooden boards in spiral and geometric designs.  The dung is mixed with ash, which kills bacteria and odor and is left to harden and is then decorated using colours made from organic material. The traditional colours are black, white, red, grey and beige-yellow but increasingly other colours are used.

The imigongo images were originally found in Kibungo inside the walls of huts as "magical" decorations during the 18th century.

There is also a legend that imigongo was invented as an interior decoration by Prince Kakira of Gisaka Kingdom in Nyarubuye in the 1800s.

During the 1994 Genocide(The Rwandan Genocide& The Nyarubuye massacre), the skills involved almost disappeared. However, a women's cooperative on the road to Rusumo in the Eastern Province near Kirehe has rescued and revived this uniquely Rwandan art form.  Traditionally geometric designs are produced but as the women artists have grown in confidence they have begun to experiment with more modern, innovative images that convey the spirit of the Rwandan landscape, its flora and fauna and its people.

References

External links

"More about Imigongo", John Pugh in Rwanda.
"From the Ashes: Rwanda’s Traditional Imigongo Art Is on the Rise"

Rwandan culture
African art
Feces
Cattle products